Scindapsus officinalis is a species of flowering plants in the Araceae family. The species is native to the Indian subcontinent and Indo-China. The plant has local names such as pipul, gajpipul, and tiakathal.

Description
The species is a large climbing liana with a thick stem and broad, dark green leaves. It is an epiphyte on trees and rocks. It is native to tropical forests of India, Myanmar, China, and Nepal.

Uses
The fruit is used medicinally as a stimulant and treatment for rheumatism. Fruits are cultivated in India and is an important ingredient in Ayurveda.

References

Flora of India (region)
Flora of Myanmar
Flora of China
Flora of Nepal
Monsteroideae